The Canadian Major Junior Hockey League (CMJHL) is the original name of two organizations:

The Western Hockey League was known as the CMJHL in its inaugural season of 1966–67 before changing its name to the Western Canada Hockey League
The Canadian Hockey League was originally called the CMJHL upon its founding in 1975 before shortening its name some time later

See also
 Canadian Junior Hockey League
 Canadian Hockey League (disambiguation)